Haskell is a city in Saline County, Arkansas, United States. The population was 3,990 at the 2010 census. It is part of the Little Rock–North Little Rock–Conway Metropolitan Statistical Area.

Geography
Haskell is located at  (34.512171, -92.638978).

Demographics

2020 census

As of the 2020 United States census, there were 3,956 people, 1,197 households, and 931 families residing in the city.

2000 census
As of the census of 2000, there were 2,645 people, 724 households, and 563 families residing in the city. The racial makeup of the city was 89.07% White, 8.77% Black or African American, 0.72% Native American, 0.23% Asian, 0.19% from other races, and 1.02% from two or more races.  1.36% of the population were Hispanic or Latino of any race.

There were 724 households, out of which 42.8% had children under the age of 18 living with them, 60.2% were married couples living together, 12.8% had a female householder with no husband present, and 22.2% were non-families. 18.4% of all households were made up of individuals, and 6.8% had someone living alone who was 65 years of age or older.  The average household size was 2.66 and the average family size was 3.03.

In the city, the population was spread out, with 21.8% under the age of 18, 8.5% from 18 to 24, 36.4% from 25 to 44, 20.9% from 45 to 64, and 12.4% who were 65 years of age or older.  The median age was 36 years. For every 100 females, there were 126.5 males.  For every 100 females age 18 and over, there were 131.7 males.

The median income for a household in the city was $33,583, and the median income for a family was $38,438. Males had a median income of $28,547 versus $21,346 for females. The per capita income for the city was $13,692.  About 12.7% of families and 22.1% of the population were below the poverty line, including 18.0% of those under age 18 and 16.3% of those age 65 or over.

Education
It is in the Harmony Grove School District, which operates Harmony Grove High School.

References

External links

Cities in Arkansas
Cities in Saline County, Arkansas
Cities in Little Rock–North Little Rock–Conway metropolitan area